Local elections were held in the province of Bulacan on May 10, 2010, as part of the 2010 general election. Voters selected candidates for all local positions: a town mayor, vice mayor and town councilors, as well as members of the Sangguniang Panlalawigan, the vice-governor, governor and representatives for the four districts of Bulacan.

Results

Gubernatorial election

Vice gubernatorial election

Congressional elections

Each of Bulacan's four legislative districts will elect each representative to the House of Representatives. The candidate with the highest number of votes wins the seat.

Malolos was given its own congressional seat from Bulacan's 1st district by virtue of Republic Act 9591. However, the Supreme Court ruled it unconstitutional, saying it violated Article VI Section 5 (3) of the Constitution and Section 3 of the Ordinance attached to constitution; Malolos was ruled not to have exceeded the 250,000 population for a separate legislative district.

In Bulacan, members of the same families will run against each other. Former governor Josie dela Cruz established the Del Pilar party (named after Gregorio del Pilar) as the local affiliate of the Liberal Party.

1st District
Ma. Victoria Sy-Alvarado is the incumbent. She will face Roberto Pagdanganan.

Malolos was supposed to have its own representation in the House of Representatives, but was ruled unconstitutional by the Supreme Court for the city did not have enough population to be given separate representation. Malolos residents will continue to be represented as a part of Bulacan's 1st district.

|-bgcolor=efefef
|colspan=5| Election deferred, to be held on November 13, 2010.
|}

Special election
The COMELEC ruled that candidates that contested the Bulacan-1st and Malolos will contest the seat. Aniag and Domingo withdrew prior to the election, while independents Cruz and Valencia did not campaign.

2nd District
Pedro Pancho is the incumbent.  He will face 2007 challenger and former three-term Guiguinto, Bulacan mayor Ambrosio "Boy" Cruz Jr.

3rd District
Incumbent Lorna Silverio is in her third consecutive term already and is ineligible for reelection. She will run for mayor of San Rafael and her husband, Ricardo Silverio, Sr. will run for her seat. His opponents are his son, Ricardo Silverio, Jr. and the current governor of Bulacan - Joselito Mendoza.

4th District
Reylina Nicolas (Lakas-Kampi-CMD) is in her third consecutive term already and is ineligible for reelection.

Malolos
With the issue on Malolos' separate congressional district from Bulacan's 1st district resolved with finality, an election will be scheduled to elect the representative for Bulacan's 1st district, including Malolos."

Voting for Malolos' congressional district was continued. The results:

|-bgcolor=efefef
|colspan=5| Election invalidated; election to be held as part of Bulacan–1st on November 13.

San Jose del Monte
San Jose del Monte is a component city of Bulacan. Arthur Robes is the incumbent.

Sangguniang Panlalawigan elections
All 4 Districts of Bulacan will elect Sangguniang Panlalawigan or provincial board members. The first (including Malolos) and fourth (including San Jose del Monte) districts sends three board members each, while the second and third districts sends two board members each. Election is via plurality-at-large voting; a voter can vote up to the maximum number of board members his district is sending.

The Liberal Party won seven out of the ten partisan seats in the provincial council, with Lakas Kampi CMD winning two, and the Nacionalista Party winning one; only the Liberals and Lakas-Kampi parties fielded complete lineups in the provincial board elections. An additional three more members will be selected from the provincial chapter of the barangay captains, Sangguniang Kabataan, and the sectoral representative.

Summary

1st District

|-
|colspan=5 bgcolor=black|

2nd District

|-
|colspan=5 bgcolor=black|

3rd District

|-
|colspan=5 bgcolor=black|

4th District

|-
|colspan=5 bgcolor=black|

Mayoralty elections
All cities and municipalities of Bulacan will elect mayor and vice-mayor this election. The candidates for mayor and vice mayor with the highest number of votes wins the seat; they are voted separately, therefore, they may be of different parties when elected. Below is the list of mayoralty candidates of each city and municipalities per district.

1st District
City: Malolos
Municipalities:  Bulacan, Calumpit, Hagonoy, Paombong, Pulilan

2nd District
Municipalities: Balagtas, Baliuag, Bocaue, Bustos, Guiguinto, Pandi, Plaridel

3rd District
Municipalities: Angat, Doña Remedios Trinidad, Norzagaray, San Ildefonso, San Miguel, San Rafael

4th District
Cities: Meycauayan
Municipalities: Marilao, Obando, Santa Maria

San Jose del Monte

References

2010 Philippine local elections
Elections in Bulacan